This is an incomplete list of power plants present in Philippines.

Renewable Energy

Hydroelectric

Geothermal

Wind power plants

Biomass power

Non-renewable

Coal

Diesel

Natural gas

Nuclear

See also 
 Geothermal power in the Philippines
 List of power stations in Asia
 List of largest power stations in the world

References

External links 

 Power Plant Profiles (Philippines)
 Hydroelectric Power Plants in the Philippines
 Geothermal Power Plants in the Philippines

Philippines

Power stations